Rashed Chowdhury is a former Bangladesh Army officer. Chowdhury was a participant in the coup that led to the assassination of Sheikh Mujibur, the founding father and President of Bangladesh, in 1975. His specific role in the coup is in dispute.

After the coup, the new constitution granted him and other conspirators immunity and he went on to work as a diplomat for the Bangladesh government. After Sheikh Hasina's election in 1996, he travelled to the United States and requested asylum which was granted. He has been convicted and sentenced to death in absentia and the Bangladesh government is seeking his extradition.

1971 Bangladesh Liberation War 
Chowdhury fought in the 1971 Bangladesh Liberation War and was awarded Bir Protik, the fourth highest gallantry award in Bangladesh. However, Chowdhury's award was revoked, along with the awards of several other soldiers involved in the assassination of Sheikh Mujib.

1975 coup

In 1975 some dissatisfied Bangladesh Army officers planned to remove the government of Sheikh Mujib through a military coup d'état, the date they selected was 15 August 1975. On 14 August the officers met to finalize the plan. They attacked Sheikh Mujib's house killing him along with his entire family except two of his daughters who were living abroad on the 15 August. He was promoted to lieutenant colonel by the regime that followed.

Chowdhury's involvement is disputed. According to a since-recanted confession, he was a member of the squad that attacked the house of Abdur Rab Serniabat who was killed in the attack. He himself has claimed that he was first informed in the morning of 15 August 1975 and was tasked with securing a nearby radio station which he did without fighting.

Career as a diplomat 
Following an abortive coup on 17 June 1980, Chowdhury was sent to the Bangladeshi diplomatic mission in Nigeria, where he worked till 1984. Chowdhury was in a diplomatic posting in Brazil when the Bangladesh Awami League and Sheikh Mujibur's daughter, Sheikh Hasina, came to power in 1996. He left his post and traveled to the United States with his wife and child on a visitor's visa after the Government of Bangladesh recalled him.

Asylum and trial
Chowdhury applied for political asylum in the United States in 1996 and was granted asylum in 2004. His asylum status was upheld by the Board of Immigration Appeals in 2006.

While in the United States, he was tried in absentia for his participation in the assassination and the Bangladesh High Court sentenced him and eleven other people to death. On 19 November 2009, Bangladesh Supreme Court upheld the High Court verdict. His conviction was based on the confessions of a co-defendant who alleged that Chowdhury was involved in the attack and assassination of Abdur Rab Serniabat. According to the United States asylum proceedings, the witness later recanted their statement, saying they were tortured before signing the paper they never read.

In the following years, Bangladesh officials have request the extradition of Chowdhury multiple times. In 2020, United States Attorney General William Barr has reopened the case, a move Chowdhury's attorneys have described as a favour to Bangladesh.

References

Assassination of Sheikh Mujibur Rahman
People convicted of murder by Bangladesh
Bangladeshi lieutenant colonels